Cari Lekebusch (born 1972) is a Swedish electronic music producer and DJ based in Stockholm. His productions range from techno to hip hop. He owns a record label, H. Productions, founded and managed by himself. The original name of the record label was Hybrid productions, but a legal twist in 1998 with the Japanese label Avex Trax's British group Hybrid forced Lekebusch to change his record label name to its present name. His studio is called HP HQ (Hybrid production Headquarters).

In the early 1990s Lekebusch became a member of the Stockholm-based remix service group SweMix that at that time had notable members as Denniz Pop and StoneBridge (which is called the grandfather of Swedish house music). After a while Lekebusch started to venture out from remixing other artists to create his own music that became not even nearly as mainstream as SweMix productions and at the same time Lekebusch really started to explore techno and electronica. Lekebusch left the remix group not long after.

Since the early-mid 1990s he has collaborated with Adam Beyer, Robert Leiner, Alexi Delano, Thomas Krome, Jesper Dahlbäck, Joel Mull, Mark Williams and many more. Cari has been in the constellation Kozmic Gurt Brodhas (aka KGB), the two other members are Abi Lönnberg and David Roiseux. Recently Lekebusch has also started to produce other artist as well with music leaning more towards hip-hop with electronic influences, two being Max Peezay and NFL Kru.

Cari Lekebusch has recorded under many aliases like Agent Orange, Braincell, Cerebus, Crushed Insect, Fred, Fred To The Midwest, Kari Pekka, Magenta, Mr. Barth, Mr. James Barth, Mystic Letter K, Phunkey Rhythm Doctor, Rotortype, Rubberneck, Shape Changer, Sir Jeremy Augustus Hutley Of Granith Hall, Szerementa Programs, The Mantis, Vector, and Yakari.

Some of Cari's early musical influences are Afrika Bambaata, Kraftwerk, James Brown, Mantronix, Herbie Hancock, Ralph Lundsten and Egyptian Lover.

Selected discography 
 Juicy Lucy, 12", Acid All Stars, 2008
 Handle With Care, 12", Audio Emotions, 2006
 Darkfunk Matters, 12", Tortured Records, 2005
 Prophecies (alias Mystic Letter K), LP, H. Productions, 2005
 The Architect, CD/LP, Truesoul Records, 2004
 Chaos & Order, CD/LP, H. Productions, 2000
 Det Jag Vet, CD, H. Productions, 1999
 Stealin Music (alias Mr. James Barth), CD/LP, Svek, 1998
 Vänsterprassel Me, 12", Drumcode Records, 1996

External links
www.lekebuschmusik.se
Cari Lekebusch discography @ Discogs.com
Cari Lekebusch on MySpace
Cari Lekebusch in Second Life

1972 births
Living people
Swedish DJs
Techno musicians
Electronic dance music DJs